Protomelittomma insulare is a species of beetle in the family Lymexylidae, the only species in the genus Protomelittomma.

References

External links

Cucujoidea genera
Lymexylidae